Patrick Roberts (born 25 October 1981) is an Australian crossover violinist and recording artist. Roberts is best known for his contemporary renditions of popular classical music. He is also an ambassador for the National Breast Cancer Foundation.

Early life
Roberts was born in Melbourne, Australia. At the age of five his mother and father bought him a violin and introduced him to lessons; he soon began performing to close friends and family. At the age of eleven, he was invited to perform live on stage by concert and event organisers at The Australian International Airshow 2017.

In 1998, Roberts trained at the Conservatorium of Music in Melbourne, where he was awarded the Betty Barwell Scholarship and Dame Nellie Melba Scholarship. He studied with Eastern European teachers during his  upbringing with notable connections with Mark Mogilevski and Ivana Tomaskova.

Roberts played in the Melbourne Symphony Orchestra for several years before being a soloist for the Victorian Concert Orchestra.

Career

2006-present
In 2010, Roberts released his album All in Love is Fair featuring songs inspired by his tour of Europe in 2008.

In 2013, he released his album Vision with guest performances by the National Boys Choir & blind guitarist Lorin Nicholson on the track Ave Maria.

In 2018 Roberts released Pink through Sony Music. Proceeds from the sale of PINK will be donated to the National Breast Cancer Foundation.

In 2019 Roberts launched his album All Out of Love while making his performance debut at the Sydney Opera House performing solo alongside Graham Russell and Russell Hitchcock and the Metropolitan Orchestra. In May 2019 Air Supply invited Roberts to perform solo at the Orleans Casino showroom in Las Vegas during their USA tour.

In November 2020, Roberts released his seventh studio album Imagine with Sony Music Australia, mastered by Andy Walter at Abbey Road Studios in London who also mastered the Beatles Anthology edition. The album features classic Beatles songs performed on violin and also a special re-recording of 'Saltwater' featuring Julian Lennon & Tommy Emmanuel 20% of the proceeds of Imagine went to the Sony Foundation Australia to help young Australians affected by severe illnesses and homelessness and a portion of the proceeds of album sales also goes to Julian Lennon's White Feather Foundation.  The album reached No.1 on the Classical/Crossover ARIA chart.

In 2022 Roberts signed to Decca records and released his brand new album ‘Fragile’ featuring Sting & Tommy Emmanuel on February 18, 2022 through Decca Records. The album debuted at No.1 on the ARIA classical / crossover charts.

50% of all album proceeds are going to the Rainforest Fund to help prevent global deforestation.

On June 28 Roberts was invited to perform live with Sting at Chateau de Chambord in France as part of his My Songs tour. This concert was in front of over 18,000 people and also televised throughout France.

Discography

Albums

References

Living people
1978 births
Australian violinists
21st-century violinists